Josua Vakurunabili (born 10 June 1992) is a Fijian rugby union player.

Biography 
Vakurunabili is from Vatukarasa Village in the Nadroga Navosa Province. He made his senior international debut at the London Sevens in 2017. He was named in the Dream Team at the 2019 Singapore Sevens tournament. He was named in the winning Fiji squad for the Rugby sevens at the 2020 Summer Olympics.

Vakurunabili was part of the Fiji sevens team that won a silver medal at the 2022 Commonwealth Games. A month later, he won a gold medal at the 2022 Rugby World Cup Sevens in Cape Town.

References

External links

1992 births
Living people
Fijian rugby union players
Fijian rugby sevens players
Olympic rugby sevens players of Fiji
Rugby sevens players at the 2020 Summer Olympics
Medalists at the 2020 Summer Olympics
Olympic gold medalists for Fiji
Olympic medalists in rugby sevens
Rugby sevens players at the 2022 Commonwealth Games
Commonwealth Games silver medallists for Fiji
Commonwealth Games medallists in rugby sevens
Medallists at the 2018 Commonwealth Games
Medallists at the 2022 Commonwealth Games